Ruth Gabriela Cano Ortega is a Mexican historian focused on the history of women in Mexico and sexual diversity during the Porfirian, revolutionary and post-revolutionary periods of Mexico. She specializes in gender analysis. Cano is a professor at the El Colegio de México. 

Cano completed a Ph.D. in the history of Mexico at the School of Philosophy and Letters, UNAM. Her 1996 dissertation was titled, De la Escuela Nacional de Altos Estudios a la Facultad de Filosofia y Letras, 1910-1929 : un proceso de feminizacion. Her doctoral advisor was Javier Garciadiego.

Cano is a member of the Mexican Academy of Sciences.

Selected works

References 

Living people
Year of birth missing (living people)
Place of birth missing (living people)
Mexican women historians
20th-century Mexican women writers
20th-century Mexican historians
21st-century Mexican women writers
21st-century Mexican historians
Historians of Mexico
National Autonomous University of Mexico alumni
Academic staff of El Colegio de México
Members of the Mexican Academy of Sciences
Women's studies academics